Iraq participated in the 2010 Asian Para Games–First Asian Para Games in Guangzhou, China from 13 to 19 December 2010. Athletes from Iraq won total 20 medals (including nine gold), and finished at the seventh spot in a medal table.

References

Nations at the 2010 Asian Para Games
2010 in Iraqi sport